The 1983–84 season was Paris Saint-Germain's 14th season in existence. PSG played their home league games at the Parc des Princes in Paris, registering an average attendance of 23,968 spectators per match. The club was presided by Francis Borelli. The team was coached by Lucien Leduc until March 1984. Georges Peyroche took over as manager in April 1984. Dominique Bathenay was the team captain.

Summary

Playing in the European Cup Winners' Cup for the second season in a row in 1983–84, Paris faced Northern Irish minnows Glentoran in the first round, winning 4–2 on aggregate to meet the Juventus of Michel Platini. It was the first time PSG clashed against a big European club as well as the first of several memorable games against the Italian team. Led by star player Safet Sušić, they rose to the occasion, drawing both matches and only bowing out on away goals to the eventual winners. PSG were really close to eliminating Juve in the return leg in Turin, with a free-kick from Sušić hitting the post and Jean-Marc Pilorget missing a clear chance just before the final whistle.

PSG, however, struggled for domestic form under manager Lucien Leduc. The double title holders of the Coupe de France were eliminated at the first hurdle and, then, a bad run towards the end of the campaign saw Leduc resign as Paris face the prospect of missing out on European football. Replaced by Georges Peyroche, back following ten months of absence, PSG recovered and defeated Toulouse on the final game of the championship. Sušić's goal, the only one of the match, secured 4th place for Paris, synonym of UEFA Cup action next season.

Players 

As of the 1983–84 season.

Squad

Out on loan

Transfers 

As of the 1983–84 season.

Arrivals

Departures

Kits 

French radio RTL was the shirt sponsor. French sportswear brand Le Coq Sportif was the kit manufacturer.

Friendly tournaments

Tournoi de Paris

Tournoi Indoor de Paris-Bercy

First group stage (Group B)

Second group stage (Ranking Group)

Competitions

Overview

Division 1

League table

Results by round

Matches

Coupe de France

Round of 64

European Cup Winners' Cup

First round

Second round

Statistics 

As of the 1983–84 season.

Appearances and goals 

|-
!colspan="16" style="background:#dcdcdc; text-align:center"|Goalkeepers

|-
!colspan="16" style="background:#dcdcdc; text-align:center"|Defenders

|-
!colspan="16" style="background:#dcdcdc; text-align:center"|Midfielders

|-
!colspan="16" style="background:#dcdcdc; text-align:center"|Forwards

|-

References

External links 

Official websites
 PSG.FR - Site officiel du Paris Saint-Germain
 Paris Saint-Germain - Ligue 1 
 Paris Saint-Germain - UEFA.com

Paris Saint-Germain F.C. seasons
Association football clubs 1983–84 season
French football clubs 1983–84 season